Carl McIntosh may refer to:

 Carl McIntosh (musician), vocalist and guitarist in Loose Ends
 Carl W. McIntosh (1914–2009), American professor of forensics and acting